The 1959 Saint Louis Billikens men's soccer team represented Saint Louis University during the 1959 NCAA soccer season. The Billikens won the first ever national title this season. It was the second ever season the Billikens fielded a men's varsity soccer team, and it is considered by many American soccer historians to be the start of a dynasty.

Roster 
 Tom Barry
 Gene Block (GK)
 John Dueker
 George Endler
 Robert Endler
 John Fuchs
 Pat Griffard
 Bob Kauffman
 John Klein
 Jerry Knobbe
 Bob Malone
 Terry Malone
 Lee Manna
 John Michalski
 William Mueller (Gk)
 Bob Pisoni
 Don Range
 Tom Richmond
 Mike Shanahan
 Tom Trost

Schedule 

|-
!colspan=6 style=""| Regular season
|-

|-

|-

|-

|-

|-

|-

|-

|-

|-
!colspan=6 style=""| NCAA Tournament
|-

|-

|-

|-

References 

1959
1959 NCAA soccer independents season
1959 in sports in Missouri
1959 Saint Louis
1959 Saint Louis
1959 NCAA Soccer Tournament participants
American men's college soccer teams 1959 season